The following table gives all the urban areas in Ireland listed in the Central Statistics Office (CSO) report of the 2011 census. This includes cities, boroughs, and towns with local government councils, and other places identified by the CSO with at least 50 occupied dwellings. Census towns are required to have a local area plan if they have a population over 5,000, and are permitted to have one with a population over 1,500.

Explanation of table

Table

Notes

References
  Central Statistics Office, 2012 Census 2011 Population Classified by Area (Formerly Volume One)

See also
 List of cities, boroughs and towns in the Republic of Ireland details of municipal towns with councils, distinguishing administrative, electoral, and suburban populations

 
Cenus towns